3',4'-Methylenedioxy-α-pyrrolidinopropiophenone (MDPPP) is a stimulant designer drug. It was sold in Germany in the late 1990s and early 2000s as an ingredient in imitation ecstasy (MDMA) pills. It shares a similar chemical structure with α-PPP and MDPV, and has been shown to have reinforcing effects in rats.

Metabolism
MDPPP appears to have a similar metabolic fate as MDPV.

Legal Status

 MDPPP is a controlled substance in China.

See also 
 α-Pyrrolidinopropiophenone (α-PPP)
 4'-Methyl-α-pyrrolidinopropiophenone (MPPP)
 4'-Methoxy-α-pyrrolidinopropiophenone (MOPPP)
 3',4'-Methylenedioxy-α-pyrrolidinobutiophenone (MDPBP)
 Dimethylone

References 

Designer drugs
Pyrrolidinophenones
Benzodioxoles